Lili Gesler (born 22 October 1980 in Budapest) is a Hungarian actress.

filmography
 2000: Trautmann (TV series, episode: Wer heikel ist bleibt übrig) 
 2003: The Salmon of the St Laurence Rivers
 2005: Csudafilm 
 2007: Der Henker 
 2007: Robin Hood (TV series) 
 2008: Das Buch von Dorka 
 2009: Die Wanderhure (TV series) 
 2010: Gerichtsmediziner Dr. Leo Dalton (Silent Witness, TV series) 
 2010–2011: Jóban Rosszban (TV series) 
 2011: Die Legende 
 2011–2012: Sturm der Liebe (Telenovela)

Theater
 1999/2000: Romeo und Juliet – Julia 
 2004/05: The Sound of Music – Lisl 
 2006: Viel Lärm um Nichts – Hero 
 2007: Brilliant traces – Rosannah 
 2008: Madame Poe – Miss Poe  
 2009: Ben Hur Live – Esther 
 2011: Blood Brothers – Mia

External links
 
 Website of Lili Gesler (German only)

20th-century Hungarian actresses
21st-century Hungarian actresses
1980 births
Living people
Hungarian film actresses
Hungarian stage actresses
Actresses from Budapest